Fort Komenda was a British fort on the Gold Coast, currently preserved as a ruin. Because of its testimony to the Atlantic slave trade and European economic and colonial influence in West Africa, the fort was inscribed on the UNESCO World Heritage List in 1979, along with several other castles and forts in Ghana.

History 
Fort Komenda was established between 1695 and 1698 at Komenda, in contemporary Ghana. The fort had a very peculiar architecture, as this four-bastioned structure was built around an earlier four-bastioned English trading post, built in 1633. Fort Komenda was within cannon-shot distance to the Dutch Fort Vredenburgh. It was abandoned in 1816, after the abolition of slave trade.

The ruin of the fort was transferred to the Dutch as part of a large trade of forts between Britain and the Netherlands in 1868. When a Dutch navy ship entered the harbour of Komenda, however, the local population resisted the transfer of the fort to the Dutch. Through the use of force, Dutch rule was eventually established. Between December 1869 and January 1870, a military expedition was sent to the local capital of Kwassie-Krom. A deadly battle ensued, but the Dutch managed to emerge as victors. It was a Pyrrhic victory, however, as the ongoing problems with the local population meant that on 6 April 1872, the entire Dutch Gold Coast, was again transferred to the United Kingdom, as per the Gold Coast treaty of 1871.

Gallery

See also 
Komenda Wars
John Cabess

References

Citations

Buildings and structures completed in 1633
Buildings and structures completed in 1682
History of Ghana
Castles in Ghana
Dutch Gold Coast
1633 establishments in the British Empire
Komenda
African resistance to colonialism